A Week at the Warehouse is the third solo album by Alan Doyle, released on October 13, 2017.

Track listing

The song "Bully Boys" was used in a scene in the film Robin Hood (2010), in which Doyle starred as Allan A'Dayle.

Charts

References

2017 albums
Alan Doyle albums